Soliman Kenawy, the first Editor in Chief of the First Auto magazine in Egypt, Akhbar El Sayarat, published by Akhbar El Yom press organization.

References

Egyptian journalists
Living people
Year of birth missing (living people)